Nanakramguda temple or Sri Ranganadha swamy temple is a 400-year-old Ranganatha temple in Nanakramguda, near Manikonda in Hyderabad. It is located at Rangbagh in Nanakramguda, which is approximately 15 km from Mehdipatnam.

References

External links
  Hyderabad, India

Hindu temples in Hyderabad, India
Tourist attractions in Hyderabad, India